The Old DeLand Memorial Hospital is a historic hospital in DeLand, Florida, United States. It is located at 240 North Stone Street. On November 27, 1989; it was added to the U.S. National Register of Historic Places.

History
It was built between 1920 and 1926. On November 27, 1989; it was added to the U.S. National Register of Historic Places. It currently contains a local history museum known as the DeLand Memorial Hospital & Military Museum, with exhibits including a 1920s operating room & apothecary exhibit, a gallery of military memorabilia, and tools, equipment and appliances from the early days of the area's ice and electric business.  An adjacent building features the Elephant Fantasyland, which is a personal collection of elephant-themed collectibles, a toy collection, and the West Volusia Black Heritage Gallery.

References

External links
 Volusia County listings at National Register of Historic Places
 Florida's Office of Cultural and Historical Programs
 Volusia County listings
 DeLand Memorial Hospital Museums
 Famous Floridians of DeLand
 DeLand Memorial Hospital Museum - official site at West Volusia Historical Society

Hospital buildings completed in 1920
Hospitals in Florida
Hospitals established in 1922
National Register of Historic Places in Volusia County, Florida
Museums in DeLand, Florida
Medical museums in Florida
History museums in Florida
Hospital museums
Vernacular architecture in Florida
Hospital buildings on the National Register of Historic Places in Florida
Historically black hospitals in the United States